Akhund Mahalleh is a village in the Ardabil Province of Iran.

References

Populated places in Ardabil Province